Kavita Singh may refer to:

 Kavita Singh (scholar), Indian scholar
 Kavita Singh (politician), Indian politician